State Route 39 (SR 39) is a state highway in McMinn and Monroe counties in the eastern portion of the U.S. state of Tennessee.

Route description
SR 39 begins as a secondary highway in McMinn County in Riceville at Exit 42 on I-75. It then goes east as a 2-lane country road to the center of town and has a short concurrency with US 11/SR 2. It then turns northeast, now concurrent with US 11 BUS, to parallel US 11/SR 2 and leave Riceville to go through some countryside before entering Athens. SR 39/US 11 BUS  then goes through some suburbs and passes by Starr Regional Medical Center before entering downtown, where US 11 BUS turns northwest to join back up with US 11/SR 2, while SR 39 continues through downtown to an intersection with SR 30/SR 305/SR 307, where SR 39 turns south to become concurrent with SR 30 as a 4-lane divided highway. SR 39/SR 30 then cross over a ridge, where they leave Athens, just before the intersection where SR 39 separates from SR 30 and goes east as a rural 2-lane highway through the countryside of McMinn County before entering Englewood. It travels along various city streets through downtown before coming to an intersection with US 411/SR 33, which it turns north to become concurrent with as a 4-lane undivided highway and they go through a business district before SR 39 separates and turns east, becoming a primary highway and leaving Englewood as a curvy 2-lane highway as it enters some mountains and ridges. It winds its way through the mountains to an intersection with SR 310, where it becomes a primary highway, just before crossing into Monroe County.

The curves then straighten out as SR 39 leaves the mountains, crosses the Conasauga Creek, and starts going through some farmland. SR 39 passes through Jalapa and has a Y-intersection with SR 315 before going through some more farmland before ending at an intersection with SR 68, just north of Tellico Plains.

Major intersections

See also

References

External links

039
Transportation in McMinn County, Tennessee
Transportation in Monroe County, Tennessee